Christine Monroe (born April 17, 1962) is an American cartoonist, illustrator, and author best known for her weekly comic strip “Violet Days,” which appears in the Minneapolis Star Tribune and Duluth News Tribune. "Violet Days" has been in print since 1996. Her work has been published in Funny Times, Ripsaw, the Funny Pages, Zenith City Arts, Madcap, Twin Cities Reader, City Pages, Pulse of the Twin Cities, Transistor, and Ruminator. An anthology of her comic strips, “Ultra Violet: 10 Years of Violet Days” was published in 2004 by X-Communication.

Monroe has written and illustrated eight children's books, including the Monkey with a Tool Belt series. She has also illustrated four books for other authors. Kirkus Reviews wrote of her book, Sneaky Sheep (2010), "The silly antics will tickle young readers, who will want to visit with these daring sheep again and again. Fun for all."

She has exhibited her oil pastel drawings and comics at the Duluth Art Institute, Tweed Museum of Art, Rifle Sport Gallery, WARM, Katherine E. Nash Gallery, Palazzo Sclafani, and other galleries, coffee shops, and dimly lit hallways...

Personal life
Monroe was born and raised in Duluth, Minnesota. She graduated from the Minneapolis College of Art and Design. She lived in the Twin Cities area from 1980 to 1998, before returning to Duluth. She has a son, Michael Winslow Sweere.

Awards and honors
In 1999, City Pages named her Best Local Cartoonist, writing: “Monroe's scratchy, winsome Violet Days meanders through everyday topics: the merits of various candies, the habits of squirrels, the shoplifting rituals of young girls. And each quick meditation is delivered with a deadpan tone that indicates a sharp wit honed against life's frailties and absurdities." She is the recipient of the 2015 George Morrison Award for excellence in art. In 2016, she won an Emmy Award for her animation artwork for "Kevin Kling: Lost And Found," a documentary produced by TPT. She has been voted "Best Local Artist," "Best Local Author," and "Best Local Cartoonist" multiple times in The Duluth News Tribune and Northland Reader. Her children's books are in five languages and have won over a dozen international awards. In 2017 she was inducted into the Duluth East High School Hall Of Fame.

Bibliography
 Ultra Violet: Ten Years of "Violet Days"
 Monkey with a Tool Belt
 Monkey with a Tool Belt and the Noisy Problem
 Monkey with a Tool Belt and the Seaside Shenanigans
 Sneaky Sheep
 Cookie The Walker
 Bug On A Bike
 Monkey With A Tool Belt and the Maniac Muffins
 " Monkey With A Tool Belt and the Silly School Mystery"

As illustrator
 Big Little Brother by Kevin Kling
 Totally Uncool by Janice Levy
 Big Little Mother by Kevin Kling
 Trash Mountain by Jane Yolen

References

External links
 Interview with Chris Monroe at Radio mnartists

American women cartoonists
Living people
1962 births
American cartoonists
21st-century American women